The Memorial to Company A, Capitol Guards was an American Civil War memorial in MacArthur Park, Little Rock, Arkansas. It stood just northeast of the former Tower Building of the Little Rock Arsenal, at a junction of two of the park's internal roadways. It consisted of a bronze sculpture depicting a Confederate Army soldier in a defensive stance, holding a rifle pointed forward. The memorial was sometimes known as "Lest we forget", a line that appeared near the top of the inscription on the base. The statue was created by sculptor Rudolph Schwarz, and was installed in 1911; it was paid for by the local chapter of the Sons of Confederate Veterans, and memorializes the unit that seized the arsenal at the outset of the war.

The memorial was listed on the National Register of Historic Places in 1996, and was delisted in 2021. The statue was removed in June 2020 following the George Floyd protests.

See also
National Register of Historic Places listings in Little Rock, Arkansas
Removal of Confederate monuments and memorials

References

1911 sculptures
Monuments and memorials in the United States removed during the George Floyd protests
Confederate States of America monuments and memorials in Arkansas
Individually listed contributing properties to historic districts on the National Register in Arkansas
MacArthur Park (Little Rock, Arkansas)
Monuments and memorials in Little Rock, Arkansas
Monuments and memorials on the National Register of Historic Places in Arkansas
National Register of Historic Places in Little Rock, Arkansas
Neoclassical architecture in Arkansas
Removed Confederate States of America monuments and memorials
Tourist attractions in Little Rock, Arkansas
Former National Register of Historic Places in Arkansas
Statues in Arkansas
Statues removed in 2020